Para River may refer to:
Pará River in Brazil
Pará River (Minas Gerais) in southeastern Brazil
Para Creek in Suriname. Sometimes called Para River
Para River in India's Himachal Pradesh that flows through Ladakh and Tibet 
Para (Russia) in the central European part of Russia
The Para Rivers in South Australia
Little Para River
North Para River
South Para River
The North and South Para Rivers join at Gawler to form the Gawler River (South Australia)